Puskás Akadémia FC is a professional football club based in Felcsút, Hungary.

List of managers
 Miklós Bencés (2012–2015)
 Robert Jarni (2015–2016)
 István Szíjjártó (2016)
 István Vincze (2016)
 Attila Pintér (2016–2018)
 Miklós Bencés (2018–8 December 2018)
 János Radoki (29 December 2018 – 7 April 2019)
 András Komjáti (8 April 2019 – 3 June 2019)
 Zsolt Hornyák (7 June 2019 – present)

References

External links

Puskás Akadémia FC